"Scherzo with Tyrannosaur" is a science fiction short story  by American writer Michael Swanwick, published in 1999 and later expanded into the novel Bones of the Earth.  It won the 2000 Hugo Award for Best Short Story, was nominated for the Nebula Award, placed third in the 2000 Locus Poll, and placed fourth in the Asimov's Science Fiction Reader Poll.

Plot summary
The story follows the paleontological director of Hilltop Station, a research center set in the late Cretaceous period.  It begins as Hilltop Station throws a fund raising ball and the director must keep patrons happy as well as prevent employees from illegally using their knowledge of the past for profit.  When the director engages in unethical activities, he is forced to cover his tracks with complex time paradoxes and visits from his future self.

References

External links 
 

1999 short stories
Short stories by Michael Swanwick
Hugo Award for Best Short Story winning works
Works originally published in Asimov's Science Fiction